Caibarién is a municipality city in the Villa Clara province of Cuba.

Caibarién is known as "La Villa Blanca" for its sands and beaches.

History
The town was founded on October 26, 1832 from a map designed by Estratón Bauza. For his constant concern and tenacity in their efforts, and because he offered some of his lands and also economic concessions to the founding of the town Don Narciso de Justa is considered the founder of Caibarién.  On 1834 it was named Colonia de Vives, but in 1837 the original name (Caibarién) was restored. On September 19, 1873 it was awarded the title village.

In 1878 the town already had stores, churches, schools and newspapers. Founded in Caibarién on October 25 was the committee of the Cuban Liberal Party, and elections were prepared between the Liberal Party and the Constitutional Union.

On January 1, 1879 Caibarién emerged as an independent municipality of Remedios and the first city council was established with Don Hipólito Escobar Martelo from the Liberal Party as its first Mayor. In 1891, Laureano López Cosío was chosen as Mayor.

In the second half of 1893, political turmoil began to increase, shedding elements from the Conservative Union to form a third political party called Reform. This year the mayor Cosío died and Damián Judez Celaya was elected. On January 18, 1895 Judez died and was succeeded by the Spanish merchant Antonio Imaz Llaguno.

Before the independence war of 1895 the village had achieved steady progress, showing an economic power that was a real surprise at the time.

The area was the scene of actions during the independence wars of the nineteenth century like the uprising of Carlos Roloff.

Geography
The city is situated on the north coast of Cuba, bordering the Bay of Buena Vista (Bahía de Buena Vista) of the Atlantic Ocean. It lies at the eastern extremity of the Villa Clara Province, close to the border with Sancti Spíritus Province. The town is served by the Caibarién Airport .

The municipality is divided into the barrios of Primero, Segundo, Tercero, Cuarto and Quinto.

Cayo Conuco
It was recently covered only by thin, dry pasture, however native plant species have resumed their original place. In 1948, the Asociación de Scouts de Cuba held its second national Jamboree in Cayo Conuco.

Economy and tourism

Caibarién once served as a shipping point for agricultural commodities, such as sugarcane, tobacco, and fruit. It also served as a sponge-fishing center. Its hotels are now destroyed by lack of care, and most concrete houses are crumbling onto its streets. The piers that once served as shipping points for agricultural commodities have fallen into the bay. The two sugar mills that used to send their sugar exports through the harbor are now closed and crumbling. The major sugar mill (Reforma) is now a museum for tourists.

The Parrandas carnivals take place twice a year in August–September and mid-December. They last usually for about two weeks at a time.

The main center for tourists in Caibarién is "Los Cayos" (The keys) with such cays as Cayo Santa María, Cayo Fragoso, Cayo Las Brujas, etc. New Cuban reforms now allow Cuban citizens to enter the resorts and beaches that were once exclusive to tourists.

Demographics
In 2004, the municipality of Caibarién had a population of 38,064.

Twin towns/Sister cities
 Bloomington, United States

Notable people

Gallery

See also

Cayo Fragoso Lighthouse
Cayo Santa María Lighthouse
Municipalities of Cuba
List of cities in Cuba

References

External links

Pictures of Caibarién

CMHS Radio Caibarien "La Voz de la Villa Blanca"

 
Cities in Cuba
Populated places in Villa Clara Province
Port cities and towns in Cuba
Populated places established in 1841
1840s establishments in the Spanish West Indies
1840s in Cuba
1841 establishments in the Spanish Empire 
Villa Clara Province
1841 establishments in North America